This is a list of members of the Victorian Legislative Council between 1979 and 1982. As half of the Legislative Council's terms expired at each triennial election, half of these members were elected at the 1976 state election with terms expiring in 1982, while the other half were elected at the 1979 state election with terms expiring in 1985.

Sources
 Re-member (a database of all Victorian MPs since 1851). Parliament of Victoria.

Members of the Parliament of Victoria by term
20th-century Australian politicians